Sukhanand Sagar Dam, officially called Kenpuriya Dam, is a dam and reservoir complex on the river below Sukhanand Waterfall in Madhya Pradesh, India. Completed in 2012, it lies 10 km from the town of Jawad.

Description
Sukhanand Sagar Dam is located near the famous ancient temple of Sukhanand Dham in the Jawad tehsil of Neemuch district, 10 km from Jawad in the Indian state of Madhya Pradesh. The dam is constructed from stones and has a cemented waste-ware on the river that flows from Sukhanand Waterfall. It is mainly used for irrigation and water supply. The only access to the dam is via Jawad.

References

Dams in Madhya Pradesh
Neemuch district
Dams completed in 2012
2012 establishments in Madhya Pradesh